Bucha Raion is a raion (district) of Kyiv Oblast, Ukraine. It was created in July 2020 as part of the reform of administrative divisions of Ukraine. Its administrative center is the town of Bucha. One abolished raion, Borodianka Raion, parts of abolished Kyiv-Sviatoshyn and Makariv Raions, as well as Irpin Municipality and the city of Bucha, which was previously incorporated as a city of oblast significance, were merged into Bucha Raion. The name of the raion is derived from the Dniester river.  The population of the raion is

Subdivisions
At the time of establishment, the raion consisted of 12 hromadas:
 Bilohorodka rural hromada with the administration in the selo of Bilohorodka, transferred from Kyiv-Sviatoshyn Raion; 
 Borodianka settlement hromada with the administration in the urban-type settlement of Borodianka, transferred from Borodianka Raion;
 Borshchahivka rural hromada  with the administration in the selo of Sofiivska Borshchahivka, transferred from Kyiv-Sviatoshyn Raion;
 Bucha urban hromada, with the administration in the city of Bucha, previously incorporated as a city of oblast significance;
 Dmytrivka rural hromada  with the administration in the selo of Dmytrivka, transferred from Kyiv-Sviatoshyn Raion;
 Hostomel settlement hromada, with the administration in the urban-type settlement of Hostomel, transferred from Irpin Municipality; 
 Irpin urban hromada, with the administration in the city of Irpin, transferred from Irpin Municipality;
 Kotsiubynske settlement hromada, with the administration in the urban-type settlement of Kotsiubynske, transferred from Irpin Municipality;
 Makariv settlement hromada  with the administration in the urban-type settlement of Makariv, transferred from Makariv Raion; 
 Nemishaieve settlement hromada with the administration in the urban-type settlement of Nemishaieve, transferred from Borodianka Raion;
 Piskivka settlement hromada with the administration in the urban-type settlement of Piskivka, transferred from Borodianka Raion.
 Vyshneve  urban hromada with the administration in the city of Vyshneve, transferred from Kyiv-Sviatoshyn Raion.

References

 
Raions of Kyiv Oblast
Ukrainian raions established during the 2020 administrative reform